Unbroken is a 2014 American biographical war drama film produced and directed by Angelina Jolie and written by the Coen brothers, Richard LaGravenese, and William Nicholson. It is based on the 2010 non-fiction book by Laura Hillenbrand, Unbroken: A World War II Story of Survival, Resilience, and Redemption. The film stars Jack O'Connell as American Olympian and Army officer Louis "Louie" Zamperini and Miyavi as Imperial Japanese Army (IJA) corporal Mutsuhiro Watanabe. Zamperini survived in a raft for 47 days after his bomber ditched in the ocean during the Second World War, before being captured by the Japanese and being sent to a series of prisoner of war camps.

Filming took place in Australia from October 2013 to February 2014. Unbroken had its world premiere in Sydney on November 17, 2014, followed by a London premiere at the Odeon Leicester Square on November 26, 2014. The film was released in the United States on December 25, 2014. It received mixed reviews from critics, though praise was given to O'Connell's performance, Deakins' cinematography and sound and Jolie's direction. It was a financial success, grossing $163 million worldwide. The film was followed by a sequel, Unbroken: Path to Redemption, in 2018.

Plot
During an April 1943 bombing mission against the Japanese-held island of Nauru, Louis "Louie" Zamperini is flying as a bombardier of a United States Army Air Forces B-24 Liberator when his plane is damaged in combat and a number of the crew injured. The pilot brings the aircraft to a stop at the end of the runway despite an exploded tire.

In a flashback to his early youth as an Italian-American boy in Torrance, California, Louie misbehaves by stealing, drinking liquor and smoking. He is often picked on by others for his Italian ethnicity. His brother Peter, seeing how fast Louie runs, trains him to be a runner. Louie becomes a disciplined distance runner, earning the nickname "The Torrance Tornado". Louie finishes 8th in the 1936 Summer Olympics and sets a record in the final lap for the 5,000-meter race.

Returning to his 1943 combat service, Louie leaves with some of the surviving crew and several replacements on a search-and-rescue mission with an old plane. One engine fails and the aircraft ultimately crashes in the ocean. Louie survives alongside two others, Phil and Mac, floating on two inflatable rafts.

On their 27th day adrift, they attract the attention of a Japanese fighter plane, which strafes and damages the rafts but misses them. Mac dies six days later. On the 47th day, Japanese sailors find and capture Louie and Phil. Now prisoners of war, Louie and Phil are imprisoned on Kwajalein Atoll. The American airmen are interrogated for info on newer bombers and the Norden bombsight. Louie states they flew older models and draws a rendering of a Philco radio. They are dragged out to disrobe and kneel on planks, expecting to be executed. Instead, they are crudely washed and shipped to Japan. Upon arrival, they are sent to different POW camps.

At camp Ōmori, in Tokyo, Louis and his fellow POWs are the responsibility of Japanese corporal Mutsuhiro Watanabe who is especially hard on Louie, beating him often. Louie is given an opportunity to broadcast a message home saying he is alive after learning the U.S. government classified him as KIA. As he refuses to broadcast another message full of anti-American propaganda, he is sent back to camp, where Watanabe has each prisoner punch him.

After two years, Watanabe is promoted to Sergeant and leaves the camp. The camp is damaged when Tokyo was bombed, so Louie and the others are moved to Naoetsu prison camp. Here, Watanabe is again in command but as he is now a Sergeant, he supervises the prisoners at work loading coal barges. Louie pauses during work and is punished by Watanabe making him lift a large wooden beam and hold it over his head. He orders a guard to shoot him if he drops it, but Louie defiantly holds it up despite his exhaustion. This enrages Watanabe as Louie stares him straight in the eye, provoking him to beat him severely.

At the end of the war, Louie and the other POWs are liberated when the Americans occupy Japan just as a bomber flies overhead and confirms that the war is over. Louie tries to find Watanabe in his quarters but sees he has already fled. He sits down, staring at a picture of Watanabe as a child alongside his father. He is returned home to America, where he kisses the ground on arriving home.

At the end of the film, there is a slideshow of the real Louie and the events in his life following the war: He married and had two children. Phil too survived and married. Mutsuhiro "The Bird" Watanabe went into hiding and evaded prosecution despite being on the top 40 most-wanted Japanese war criminals list by General Douglas MacArthur. Louie lived out his promise to convert to Christianity, to devote his life to God and to forgive his wartime captors, meeting with many of them. Many years later, however, Watanabe still refused to meet with Louie.

Louie had an opportunity to relive his time as an Olympian when he ran a leg of the Olympic Torch relay for the 1998 Winter Olympics in Nagano, Japan. He was four days short of his 81st birthday, on a stretch not far from one of the POW camps where he was held. The closing titles reveal that Louie Zamperini died on July 2, 2014, at the age of 97.

Cast

 Jack O'Connell as Capt. Louis "Louie" Zamperini, a former Olympian and bombardier who is held in captivity by the Japanese.
 C.J. Valleroy as young Louis Zamperini
 Domhnall Gleeson as Lt. Russell "Phil" Phillips, Louie's companion at sea and his capture
 Garrett Hedlund as Lt. Cmdr.  John Fitzgerald (captain of submarine USS Grenadier)
 Miyavi as Sgt. Mutsuhiro "The Bird" Watanabe, a sadistic prison camp commander who treats Louie cruelly.
 Finn Wittrock as T-3 S/Sgt. Francis "Mac" McNamara
 Jai Courtney as Lt. Charlton Hugh "Cup" Cupernell
 Luke Treadaway as Miller
 Spencer Lofranco as Harry Brooks
 Travis Jeffery as Jimmy	
 Jordan Patrick Smith as Cliff
 John Magaro as Frank A. Tinker
 Alex Russell as Pete Zamperini, Louie's brother
 John D'Leo as Young Pete
 Vincenzo Amato as Anthony Zamperini
 Louis McIntosh as William Frederick Harris
 Ross Anderson as Blackie
 Maddalena Ischiale as Louise Zamperini, Louie's mother
 Savannah Lamble as Sylvia Zamperini, Louie's younger sister
 Sophie Dalah as Virginia Zamperini, Louie's second younger sister

Production

Development
Universal Pictures purchased the rights to the book in January 2011, having already acquired the film rights to Zamperini's life story towards the end of the 1950s. Early drafts for the film were written by William Nicholson and Richard LaGravenese while Francis Lawrence was scheduled to direct. Joel and Ethan Coen were then tapped to rewrite the script after Jolie was named director.

On September 30, 2013, Jolie was confirmed to direct the film in Australia. Jolie was paid a $1 million salary for directing the film. Walden Media was originally set as Universal's co-financier, but withdrew from the project prior to filming and were subsequently replaced by Legendary Pictures. The filming was based in New South Wales and Queensland, with scenes also shot in Fox Studios Australia and Village Roadshow Studios.

Filming
Principal photography began on October 16, 2013, in Queensland, Australia and ended on February 4, 2014, with post-production also being done in Australia.

Some of the scenes were shot at sea in Moreton Bay on October 16, 2013. On December 14, four days of filming were completed in Werris Creek, New South Wales.

The POW "Coal" scenes were all filmed at Cockatoo Island (New South Wales)

Music

The official film soundtrack was released on December 15, 2014, through Parlophone and Atlantic Records. The film score was composed by Alexandre Desplat. The album also features "Miracles", a song written and recorded by British alternative rock band Coldplay, which was released digitally as a single on December 15.

Reception

Box office
Unbroken grossed $115.6 million in the U.S. and Canada and $47.6 million in other territories for a worldwide total of $163 million, against a budget of $65 million.

The film opened in North America on December 25, 2014, across 3,131 theaters and grossed $15.6 million on its opening day (including Christmas Eve previews) which is the third-biggest Christmas Day debut ever, behind Les Misérables ($18 million), and Sherlock Holmes ($24 million) and the fifth-biggest Christmas Day gross ever. The film was one of the four widely released films on December 25, 2014, the other three being Walt Disney's Into the Woods (2,478 theaters), Paramount Pictures' The Gambler (2,478 theaters) and TWC's Big Eyes (1,307 theaters). It earned $31,748,000 in its traditional three-day opening weekend (including its revenue from Christmas Day it earned $47.3 million) debuting at #2 at the box office behind The Hobbit: The Battle of the Five Armies setting a record for the third-biggest Christmas debut behind Sherlock Holmes ($62 million) and Marley & Me ($36 million). and fourth biggest among World War II theme movies. It was the eighth film that earned $25 million plus in its debut weekend for Universal Pictures and the fifth $30 million plus debut for an "original" movie following Lone Survivor, Ride Along, Neighbors and Lucy.

Critical response

The film received mixed reviews from critics. Rotten Tomatoes gives the film a rating of 50% based on 230 reviews, with an average rating of 6.00/10. The website's critical consensus reads, "Unbroken is undoubtedly well-intentioned, but it hits a few too many of the expected prestige-pic beats to register as strongly as it should." On Metacritic, the film has a score of 59 out of 100 based on 48 reviews, indicating "mixed or average reviews". Audiences surveyed by CinemaScore gave the film an average grade of "A−" on an A+ to F scale. The audience was 52 percent female and 71 percent over the age of 25.

The SAG Nominating Committee gave it a standing ovation after a screening.

The score received a mixed critical reaction. Callum Hofler of Entertainment Junkie stated, "At its finest, Unbroken is perhaps Desplat's strongest and most resonant emotional work since The Tree of Life or Harry Potter and the Deathly Hallows – Part 2, both from 2011. It comes off as bold, ambitious, yet intimate and sentimental all the same. It can be an elegant and harmonious exploration of human determination, drive and spirit." He also criticized numerous components, claiming that, "In most cases though, the primary issue with the album is its lack of energy and vitality. There is many a time where the music seems to just sit in place, lacking major progression in character, motive or mindset." He awarded the score a final rating of 6 out of 10. Jorn Tillnes of Soundtrack Geek acclaimed the album, stating, "This score is pretty great. It's been a really good year for Desplat. Godzilla and The Monuments Men at the top of the pile, but this is not far behind." He summarized with, "It is a turning point though for those who think Desplat is about boring bass rhythms and motifs. This might even get the haters to respect him as a composer." He awarded the score an 87.8 out of 100.

Controversies
Prior to the film's release, some Japanese nationalists asked for the film and the director to be banned from their country, largely because of a part in Hillenbrand's book, which was not depicted in the film, where she writes "POWs were beaten, burned, stabbed, or clubbed to death, shot, beheaded, killed during medical experiments, or eaten alive in ritual acts of cannibalism" by the Imperial Japanese Army. A petition on Change.org calling for a ban attracted more than 10,000 signatures. In response, it triggered a Change.org petition by Dutch Indonesian group The Indo Project voicing support for the movie, as they saw it as a reflection of what their family members in the former Dutch East Indies experienced in Japanese camps. Several prominent Dutch Indos (including those who are not descendants of former POWs), such as author Adriaan van Dis, Doe Maar frontman Ernst Jansz, and actress Wieteke van Dort, signed the petition in support of the film. Another petition on Change.org calling for a release of the film in Japan, this time in Japanese, gathered more than 1,200 signatures. The film was eventually released in Japan on February 6, 2016, by independent distributor Bitters End on a much smaller scale than originally intended, while Toho-Towa, the usual distributor of Universal titles, had passed on releasing the film.

The film received some criticism for omitting Zamperini's fight against alcoholism and PTSD, as well as his Billy Graham-inspired religious conversion.

Accolades

Home media
Unbroken was released on March 24, 2015 in the United States in two formats: a one-disc standard DVD and a Blu-ray Combo pack (Blu-ray + DVD + Digital Copy).

Sequel

A faith-based film also based on Hillenbrand's book, titled Unbroken: Path to Redemption, which depicts later events of Zamperini's life than those depicted in Unbroken, was released by Pure Flix Entertainment on September 14, 2018. It was directed by Harold Cronk with the script written by Richard Friedenberg and Ken Hixon. Aside from producer Matthew Baer and actors Vincenzo Amato and Maddalena Ischiale, who reprised the roles of Anthony and Louise Zamperini, none of the original cast or crew was involved in the new film. Legendary Pictures also had no involvement with the sequel.

See also
 The Great Raid, a 2005 war film about the raid at Cabanatuan in the Philippines during World War II.
 To End All Wars, a 2001 film set in a Japanese prisoner of war labour camp where the inmates are building the Burma Railway during World War II.
 Merry Christmas, Mr. Lawrence
 My Way, a 2011 South Korean war film based on the story of a Korean captured by the Americans on D-Day.
 List of World War II films

References

External links

 
 
 
 
 

2014 films
2014 biographical drama films
2014 war drama films
American war drama films
2010s Japanese-language films
Biographical films about sportspeople
Biographical films about military personnel
World War II films based on actual events
World War II prisoner of war films
Films about survivors of seafaring accidents or incidents
Films about the United States Army Air Forces
American films based on actual events
Race-related controversies in film
Film controversies
Film controversies in Japan
Obscenity controversies in film
Films based on biographies
Films set in Japan
Pacific War films
Athletics films
Films about the 1936 Summer Olympics
Films about Olympic track and field
Legendary Pictures films
Universal Pictures films
Films scored by Alexandre Desplat
Films directed by Angelina Jolie
Films produced by Angelina Jolie
Films produced by Clayton Townsend
American historical action films
Films with screenplays by the Coen brothers
Films with screenplays by William Nicholson
3 Arts Entertainment films
Cultural depictions of track and field athletes
2014 drama films
Japan in non-Japanese culture
Films shot at Village Roadshow Studios
2010s English-language films
2010s American films